Bevinje Vishnu Kakkilaya ( - 4 June 2012) was an Indian freedom fighter and leader of Communist Party of India from Karnataka India. He fought for the rights of laborers and workers. He also raised his voice for downtrodden and small farmers who were at the mercy of powerful people. He was jailed during British rule of India for his struggle against the oppression of poor people. Even after independence of India from British on 15 August 1947, he continued his fight for the legitimate rights of poor people in society. He was at the forefront in organising Beedi workers to get them benefits as per law and also improvement of their working conditions. He also highlighted the plight of Mangalore tile workers, and agricultural labourers working in cardamom, coffee estates and plantations. B.V. Kakkilaya fought for unification of Kannada speaking areas into Karnataka state. Even though Kasargod was taluk in erstwhile South Kanara district during British rule, it was left out of Karnataka state and added to Kerala state in 1956 during reorganisation of states in independent India. He worked as general secretary of Akhanda Karnataka Rajya Nirmana Parishat.

Political career 
Member of the Rajya Sabha from Madras Assembly between 1952 and 1954.
MLA  Bantwal  from 1972 to 1978 and Vittal constituency from 1978 to 1983.

As a writer
Some of his works are on
Communism
Bhoomi mathu akasha 
Maanavana Nadige Vijnanadedege
Karl Marx: Baduku, baraha
Bharathiya Chinthane, Hindu dharma, Communism
Bharathada muslimarau, a translation of Sacchar committee report and others.
Iravu Mattu Arivu
Pracheena Bharathadalli Bhouthikavada
Bhaarateeya Darshanagalu
Puran Chandra Joshi - Communist Chaluvaliya Roovari 
Pracheena Bharatadalli Jatigala Ugama
Bharatakkondu Badalu Dari

References

1910s births
2012 deaths
Indian independence activists
Karnataka politicians
Communist Party of India politicians from Karnataka